The House of Giedroyć (French: Guedroitz) is the name of an aristocratic clan and family which traces its origins to the Grand Duchy of Lithuania and the Polish-Lithuanian Commonwealth. According to the 16th century Lithuanian Chronicle, they are descendants of Prince Giedrius, a brother of Grand Duke Traidenis.

Many family members were important figures in Lithuanian, Polish, Russian, French and British history or culture.

The family's original domain was the Lithuanian town of Giedraičiai.

Notable members
 Blessed Michał Giedroyć (1420–1485), Augustinian monk 
 Merkelis Giedraitis (1536–1609), Bishop of Samogitia
 Romuald Giedroyć (1750–1824), Commander of the allied Lithuanian regiments of Napoleon's Grande Armée 
 Vera Gedroitz (1870–1932), Russian military surgeon
 Konstantin Gedroits (1872–1932), Russian soil scientist
 Wladimir Guedroitz (1873–1941), Chamberlain of the Imperial Court of Russia 
 Jerzy Giedroyc (1906–2000), Polish writer and political activist
 Alexis Guedroitz (1923–1992), Professor of Russian Language and Literature
 Michal Giedroyc (1929–2017), Polish-Lithuanian-British aircraft designer
 Ania Guédroïtz (born 1949), Belgian actress
 Coky Giedroyc (born 1963), English film and television director (Sherlock)
 Jason Gedroic (Jason Gedrick, born 1965) American actor best known for his work on the television series Murder One and Boomtown, and the motion picture Iron Eagle
 Mel Giedroyc (born 1968), English presenter and comedian, best known for The Great British Bake Off

See also
Giedroyć

External links
 A bit on family by Lithuanian historian Zenonas Ivinskis